Macaroeris is a spider genus of the jumping spider family, Salticidae.

Name
The genus name is combined from Macaronesia, where most species of the genus occur, and the salticid spider genus Eris.

Species
As of June 2017, the World Spider Catalog lists the following species in the genus:
 Macaroeris albosignata Schmidt & Krause, 1996 – Canary Islands
 Macaroeris asiatica Logunov & Rakov, 1998 – Central Asia
 Macaroeris cata (Blackwall, 1867) – Madeira, Romania
 Macaroeris desertensis Wunderlich, 1992 – Madeira
 Macaroeris diligens (Blackwall, 1867) – Madeira, Canary Islands
 Macaroeris flavicomis (Simon, 1885) – Greece, Turkey, Ukraine
 Macaroeris litoralis Wunderlich, 1992 – Canary Islands
 Macaroeris moebi (Bösenberg, 1895) – Canary Islands, Savage Islands, Madeira, China
 Macaroeris nidicolens (Walckenaer, 1802) – Europe to Central Asia

References

External links
Photograph of M. diligens
Photograph of M. nidicolens

Salticidae
Salticidae genera
Spiders of Asia